Hubrechtiidae is a family of worms belonging to the order Hubrechtiiformes.

References

Palaeonemertea
Nemertea families